Arthur Y. Chen is a Taiwanese politician. He was the first Minister of Public Construction Commission in 1995–1996.

References

Government ministers of Taiwan
Living people
Year of birth missing (living people)